Ying Lung Wai is a walled village in the Yuen Long Kau Hui area of Yuen Long District, Hong Kong.

Administration
Ying Lung Wai is a recognized village under the New Territories Small House Policy.

History
Ying Lung Wai was established by a branch of the Tang Clan of Kam Tin, who had set up the nearby villages of Sai Pin Wai and Nam Pin Wai, but later moved to the area to establish the village due to feng shui reasons.

At the time of the 1911 census, the population of Ying Lung Wai was 94. The number of males was 38.

Ying Lung Wai is part of the Tung Tau alliance or "Joint Meeting Group of Seven Villages", together with Nam Pin Wai, Tung Tau Tsuen, Choi Uk Tsuen, Shan Pui Tsuen, Wong Uk Tsuen and Tai Wai Tsuen. The Yi Shing Temple in Wong Uk Tsuen is an alliance temple of the Tung Tau Alliance.

See also
 Walled villages of Hong Kong

References

External links

 Delineation of area of existing village Ying Lung Wai (Shap Pat Heung) for election of resident representative (2019 to 2022)

Walled villages of Hong Kong
Yuen Long
Shap Pat Heung
Villages in Yuen Long District, Hong Kong